Sinofert Holdings Limited or Sinofert, formerly Sinochem Hong Kong Holdings Limited, is the largest all-rounded fertilizer enterprise in China. It is engaged in chemical fertilizer business in China, which involves research and development, production, procurement, distribution of various fertilizers.

It is 53% owned by Sinochem Group, 22% owned by PotashCorp, and the remaining 25% is traded on the Hong Kong Stock Exchange.

References

External links
Sinofert Holdings Limited

Sinochem Group
Companies based in Beijing
Companies listed on the Hong Kong Stock Exchange
Fertilizer companies of China
Government-owned companies of China
Chinese companies established in 1994